The  is a kei car produced by Suzuki between 1998 and 2009. Originally only available as a three-door hatchback, a five-door version arrived in the third quarter of 1999. The car received a facelift in late 2000, when the three-door version was also dropped, and another facelift in 2001, including a newer dashboard.

Gallery 
Suzuki Kei

Mazda Laputa

References 

Kei
Cars introduced in 1998
2000s cars
Kei cars
Kei sport utility vehicles
Front-wheel-drive vehicles
All-wheel-drive vehicles